Angle Tarn is a tarn to the north of Bowfell in the English Lake District. It drains into Langstrath Beck.

References

Lakes of the Lake District
Allerdale